Jacob Parsons (27 February 1903 – 1953) was an English professional footballer who played in the Football League for Accrington Stanley, Barrow, Exeter City, Mansfield Town, Southport and Thames.

References

1903 births
1953 deaths
English footballers
Association football forwards
English Football League players
Southport F.C. players
Barrow A.F.C. players
Exeter City F.C. players
Thames A.F.C. players
Mansfield Town F.C. players
Rotherham United F.C. players
Accrington Stanley F.C. (1891) players